The Jazz Discography is a print, CD-ROM, and online discography and sessionography of all categories of recorded jazz — and directly relevant precursors of recorded jazz from 1896.  The publisher, Lord Music Reference Inc., a British Columbia company, is headed by Tom Lord and is based in Chilliwack, British Columbia, Canada.  The initial 26 of 35 print volumes, which comprise the discography, were issued from 1992 to 2001 in alphabetic order.  In 2002, The Jazz Discography became the first comprehensive jazz discography on CD-ROM.

Scope 
The Jazz Discography covers all categories of jazz and other creative improvised music, including traditional, swing, bebop, modern, avant-garde, fusion, third stream, and others.  As of January 2008, the database contained 34,861 leaders, 181,392 recording sessions, 1,030,109 musician entries, and 1,077,503 tune entries.

Early listings 
There is an ongoing debate over when and where the word "jazz" became a common, commercial reference for the jazz genre, a genre that predates the word.  Bert Kelly (1882–1968), a banjoist and jazz club owner from Chicago, is known for having used the word "jass," on his Chicago venue marquee in 1914.  To resolve such vagaries, TJD Online allows users to search by year, beginning 1896.  The two listings of 1896 are the compositions of Scott Joplin, preserved on piano rolls — not performed by Joplin — but subsequently recorded many times.

There is a prevailing consensus that the first commercially released jazz recording was the "Livery Stable Blues" (third take), recorded on February 26, 1917, by the Original Dixieland Jass Band of New Orleans.

Sources 
Numerous data sources comprise the database. They include existing general and individual jazz discographies and international jazz periodicals. With initial mixed sentiment over some sources, reviewers observed that Lord borrowed heavily from, but expanded upon, the major comprehensive jazz discography work of Walter Bruyninckx, whose research was, and still is (as of 2013), ongoing. Sentiment grew mostly positive after the 26th printed volume was published.  Additional input has, and still is being received from recording companies and their catalogs and the issues of Cadence magazine covering many recordings not listed in other discographies. Individuals — particularly record collectors, musicologists, and jazz historians — have, and continue to provide data.

Discography format and categories 
The project is organized alphabetically by bandleader, and within each individual entry, chronologically by recording session. For each session, it identifies track and album titles, personnel and instrumentation, location and date, and recording label and numbers. Indexes are organized alphabetically by musician and by tune title. The discography includes recording dates but excludes release dates.

Limited data for cassette releases 
Some commercially available cassette releases have been included in The Jazz Discography, but the publisher makes no claim to completeness.

Publication sets 
The Jazz Discography (print)

About Tom Lord 
Before embarking on The Jazz Discography, Tom Lord had been a mechanical engineer and, later, an executive at a shipping container company.  Lord, together with Bob Rusch, founded Cadence Jazz Records in 1980, an offshoot of Cadence magazine. Lord financed the record label launch and was a silent partner. In the 1990s, Lord also indexed back issues of Cadence.

References 

Jazz Discography, The